Democratic Socialist Movement may refer to:
 Democratic socialism
 Democratic Socialist Movement (Nigeria)
 Democratic Socialist Movement (South Africa)